The Mayor of Ulaanbaatar is head of the executive branch of the political system of the city of Ulaanbaatar, Mongolia. It is also concurrent with the post of the Chairman of the Presidium of the Ulaanbaatar City Council and Governor of the Capital City. The mayor's office administers all city services and public agencies, and enforces all city laws. There have been 34 mayors of Ulaanbaatar.

Mayor's Office 
The Mayor's Office provides professional advice to the City Council and the Mayor of Ulaanbaatar. It also implements the Mayor's platform. It has the following structure:

 State Administrative Department
 Legal Department
 Social Policy Department
 Finance and Treasury Department
 Policy and Planning Department
 Foreign Relations Department
 Media and Public Relations Department
 Monitoring and Evaluation Department
 Military Staff

List of mayors 

 Dogsomyn Tsedev (–1971)
 Sonomyn Luvsangombo (1971–1972)
 Surenjavyn Balbar (1972–)
 Enebish Lhamsuren (1990-1992)
 Janlavyn Narantsatsralt (1996-1998)
 Miyeegombyn Enkhbold (1999-2005)
Tudev Bilegt (2007-2008)
 Erdeniin Bat-Üül (7 August 2012-7 July 2016)
 Amarsaikhan Sainbuyan (27 February 2019-1 July 2020)
 Jantsangiin Batbaysgalan (Acting) (1 July 2020-23 October 2020)
 Dolgorsürengiin Sumyaabazar (since 23 October 2020)

See also 

 President of Mongolia

References 

Lists of mayors